Lone Star is a populated place situated in Graham County, Arizona, United States. Eight miles north of Solomonville, the community was named after the nearby mine and mountain.

References

Populated places in Graham County, Arizona